Christopher George  Hardwick was the Dean of Truro from 2005 until 2011.

He was born on October 7, 1957 and educated at King Edward VI School (Lichfield) and the Open University. He gave up a career in banking to study at Ripon College Cuddesdon and was ordained in 1992 he was a curate at Worcester then Rector of Hill Croome before his move to the Deanery of Truro. He took suspension from his duties in 2010 while he was investigated for a supposedly controversial personal relationship, and ultimately resigned in August 2011.

Notes

1957 births
People educated at King Edward VI School, Lichfield
Alumni of the Open University
Alumni of Ripon College Cuddesdon
Deans of Truro
Living people